SecondStreet.org is a federally incorporated charity and conservative-leaning public policy think tank in Canada. The organization's mission is "to tell stories of everyday Canadians — from coast to coast — and show how they’re impacted by government policies.” 

The organization derives its name from "Second Street" being the most common street name in Canada - a place "where people live, work, learn, pray, shop, eat..." and where stories of those affected by government policies are to be told. The organization is also headquartered in Regina with staff and contributors based across Canada.

Board of directors 
SecondStreet.org has a volunteer board of directors. As of 2021, the SSO board of directors is composed of Adam Allouba (Chair), Adam Daifallah, Scott Hennig, Tracy Johnson, Steven Muchnik and Walter Robinson.

Research
SecondStreet.org has examined numerous government policies including health care, taxation and natural resources projects, and often produces publications (including news columns and policy papers) supporting its proposals.

Health care
A prominent topic of research for the organization is examining Canada's health care sector and Canadians who have died while awaiting surgery on hospital waiting lists. In November 2021, the organization filed freedom of information requests to learn more about patients dying while waiting for surgeries, revealing that government data showed over 11,400 waiting-list deaths between April 1, 2018 and Dec. 31, 2020. In March 2021, the organization also released data demonstrating the number of surgeries, procedures and specialist consultations that were postponed across Canada due to the COVID-19 pandemic, amassing close to 354,000.

Government accountability
SecondStreet.org has also publicly criticised governments for not introducing paycuts for public employees during the COVID-19 pandemic, revealing that when asking the federal government, provincial governments and 13 cities across Canada if they had ever implemented a paycut, responses ranged from "decades ago to never". This included the government of Alberta who last implemented a paycut in 1994 of five percent.
Other publications have included revealing hospital run restaurants in Ontario and Alberta which have accumulated millions of dollars worth of debt at taxpayers' expense.

Natural resources
The organization also frequently comments on natural resource development in Canada, taking a pro-oil and gas stance and publishing data on the consequences of cancelled pipeline projects (equalling $213 billion since 2014). SecondStreet.org also criticises the government's approach to outsourcing oil production to foreign nations instead of producing oil in Canada.

Affiliations
Many commentators have identifited similarities between SecondStreet.org and the right-wing advocacy group Canadian Taxpayers Federation, citing both organizations as recipients of donations from the Donner Canadian Foundation and both operating with "numerous" and "tight" links.

See also

 Fraser Institute
 Canadian Taxpayers Federation

References

External links
Website

Conservatism in Canada
Government watchdog groups in Canada
Taxpayer groups
Organizations based in Regina, Saskatchewan